Jordan Kirkpatrick (born 6 March 1992) is a Scottish professional footballer who plays as a midfielder for  club Darvel.

Career
On 26 April 2008, Kirkpatrick made his senior debut for Hamilton Academical versus Dundee. He moved on loan to Brechin City on 31 January 2011. He was given a new one-year contract in March 2012, but was released from the club on 30 December 2012.

On 19 August 2013, after a brief spell with Airdrie United, Kirkpatrick signed for Dumbarton. In March 2016, Kirkpatrick joined Scottish League Two side Clyde on loan until the end of the 2015–16 season. He was told by Dumbarton in May 2016 that he would not be offered a new contract by the club and subsequently signed for recently relegated Alloa Athletic.

After a year with Alloa, Kirkpatrick moved to Scottish Championship club St Mirren on 24 May 2017, signing a two-year contract. He returned to Alloa on loan in January 2018, until the end of the season. After featuring just three times for St Mirren the following season, he returned to Alloa on an 18-month permanent deal in January 2019.

In May 2019, it was announced that Kirkpatrick had joined Scottish League One side Forfar Athletic on a one-year deal.

In June 2020, Kirkpatrick signed for Scottish sixth tier side Darvel. He was loaned to Stirling Albion in March 2021. In January 2023 he scored the only goal as Darvel beat Aberdeen in the Scottish Cup.

Career statistics

Honours

Individual
 Scottish League One Player of the Month (1): August 2016

References

1992 births
Living people
Scottish footballers
Hamilton Academical F.C. players
Brechin City F.C. players
Airdrieonians F.C. players
Dumbarton F.C. players
Clyde F.C. players
Alloa Athletic F.C. players
St Mirren F.C. players
Forfar Athletic F.C. players
Scottish Premier League players
Scottish Football League players
Association football midfielders
Scottish Professional Football League players
Darvel F.C. players
Stirling Albion F.C. players
West of Scotland Football League players